Clear Lake State Park is a public recreation area covering  in Canada Creek Ranch, Montmorency County, Michigan. The state park occupies two-thirds of the shoreline of spring-fed,  Clear Lake. It is located within Mackinaw State Forest, which covers the northern eight counties of the Lower Peninsula.

Activities and amenities
The state park offers swimming, fishing, boat launches, hiking, picnicking, playground, and camping.

References

External links
Clear Lake State Park Michigan Department of Natural Resources 
Clear Lake State Park Map Michigan Department of Natural Resources

1926 establishments in Michigan
State parks of Michigan
Protected areas of Montmorency County, Michigan
Protected areas established in 1966
1966 establishments in Michigan